Marin Kristen Clark is an American earth scientist who is Chair for Earth and Environmental Sciences at the University of Michigan. Her research considers lithospheric deformation. She was awarded the 2003 Geological Society of America Doris M. Curtis Award.

Early life and education 
Clark was a graduate student at the Massachusetts Institute of Technology where she studied the uplift of southeastern Tibet. She worked alongside Leigh Royden on lower crustal flows and their role in building the eastern margins of Tibet.

Research and career 
Clark studies the topography of Planet Earth and its relation to deformation of the lithosphere. She is particularly interested in the evolution of rivers as these provide information about the deformation-induced vertical movement of the Earth. To study these processes, Clark makes use of topographic measurements such as field geology and geographic information system modelling. Clark has developed (U-Th)/He thermochronology to study minerals. She was awarded the 2003 Geological Society of America Doris M. Curtis Award.

After the April 2015 Nepal earthquake, Clark visited Nepal to monitor the co-seismic landslides. Making use of pre- and post-earthquake satellite imagery, she identified that the landslides were more concentrated in the North of the transition between the Lesser and Greater Himalayas.

Selected publications

References 

Living people
Year of birth missing (living people)
American earth scientists
American women scientists
Massachusetts Institute of Technology alumni
University of Michigan faculty
21st-century American women